Twelve is the first and only Japanese-language studio album (second and final overall) by South Korean–Japanese girl group Iz*One. It was released on October 21, 2020. The album was released in three different physical versions with seven different cover issues. It also contains selected tracks from previous Korean-language records re-released in Japanese.

Commercial performance
The album debuted at number one on both the Japanese Oricon chart and the Billboard Japan Hot Albums chart becoming their first project to do so. The album sold over 124,178 units on its opening day breaking the record of the highest first-day album sales by a K-pop girl group in Japan, a record previously held by #Twice2 by Twice which sold 95,825 units on its release day.

Track listing

Charts

Weekly charts

Year-end charts

Certifications and sales

References

Iz*One albums
2020 albums
Japanese-language albums
Albums produced by Yasushi Akimoto
Universal Music Japan albums